The 1922 Hammond Pros season was their third in the league. The team failed to improve on their previous output of 1–3–1, losing five games. They tied for fifteenth place in the league. The team was shut out in all six of their games.

Schedule

Standings

References

Hammond Pros seasons
Hammond Pros
1922 in sports in Indiana
National Football League winless seasons